Norris Canyon is a census-designated place in Contra Costa County, California. Norris Canyon sits at an elevation of 1063 feet (324 m). The 2010 United States census reported Norris Canyon's population was 957.

Geography
According to the United States Census Bureau, the CDP has a total area of 3.536 square miles (9.158 km), all of it land.

Demographics
At the 2010 census Norris Canyon had a population of 957. The racial makeup of Norris Canyon was 476 (49.7%) White, 41 (4.3%) African American, 1 (0.1%) Native American, 372 (38.9%) Asian, 1 (0.1%) Pacific Islander, 28 (2.9%) from other races, and 38 (4.0%) from two or more races. Hispanic or Latino of any race were 42 people (4.4%).

The census reported that 100% of the population lived in households.

There were 248 households, 165 (66.5%) had children under the age of 18 living in them, 221 (89.1%) were opposite-sex married couples living together, 12 (4.8%) had a female householder with no husband present, 8 (3.2%) had a male householder with no wife present.  There were 4 (1.6%) unmarried opposite-sex partnerships, and 3 (1.2%) same-sex married couples or partnerships. 5 households (2.0%) were one person and 0 (0%) had someone living alone who was 65 or older. The average household size was 3.86.  There were 241 families (97.2% of households); the average family size was 3.87.

The age distribution was 337 people (35.2%) under the age of 18, 65 people (6.8%) aged 18 to 24, 219 people (22.9%) aged 25 to 44, 301 people (31.5%) aged 45 to 64, and 35 people (3.7%) who were 65 or older.  The median age was 36.4 years. For every 100 females, there were 101.5 males.  For every 100 females age 18 and over, there were 97.5 males.

There were 277 housing units at an average density of ,of which 248 were occupied, 241 (97.2%) by the owners and 7 (2.8%) by renters.  The homeowner vacancy rate was 4.7%; the rental vacancy rate was 0%.  937 people (97.9% of the population) lived in owner-occupied housing units and 20 people (2.1%) lived in rental housing units.

References

Census-designated places in Contra Costa County, California
Census-designated places in California